Eiki Nestor (born 5 September 1953 in Tallinn) is an Estonian politician, member of the Social Democratic Party. He was the leader of the party from 1994 to 1996. Nestor has been a member of the 7th, 8th, 9th, 10th, 11th and 12th Parliament of Estonia, being a Minister without Portfolio in charge of regional affairs from 1994 to 1995 and a Minister of Social Affairs from 1999 to 2002. He was elected Speaker of the Riigikogu in March 2014 and served until April 2019.

Nestor graduated from the Tallinn University of Technology in 1976 as a mechanical engineer specializing in motor transport. He is married and has two sons, Siim Nestor and Madis Nestor.

References

External links
Eiki Nestor at the Estonian Parliament site riigikogu.ee

1953 births
Living people
Politicians from Tallinn
Government ministers of Estonia
Social Democratic Party (Estonia) politicians
Recipients of the Order of the National Coat of Arms, 5th Class
Recipients of the Order of the National Coat of Arms, 2nd Class
Tallinn University of Technology alumni
Members of the Riigikogu, 1992–1995
Members of the Riigikogu, 1995–1999
Members of the Riigikogu, 1999–2003
Members of the Riigikogu, 2003–2007
Members of the Riigikogu, 2007–2011
Members of the Riigikogu, 2011–2015
Members of the Riigikogu, 2015–2019
Speakers of the Riigikogu
Leaders of political parties in Estonia
20th-century Estonian politicians
21st-century Estonian politicians